Mellerstain House is a stately home around  north of Kelso in the Borders, Scotland. It is currently the home of George Baillie-Hamilton, 14th Earl of Haddington, and is designated as a historical monument.

History
The older house or castle at Mellerstain included an old five-storey tower, ruinous in 1700. Mellerstain was built between 1725 and 1778. The architect William Adam initially designed the east and west wings for George Baillie (1664–1738) and his wife Lady Grisell (1665–1746), daughter of Patrick Hume, Earl of Marchmont. Work ceased after the wings were completed, and it was another 45 years before George Baillie commissioned Robert Adam to design and build the main mansion house. George was the second son of Charles, Lord Binning (1697–1732), heir to the 6th Earl of Haddington, and he inherited the Mellerstain estate when his aunt Grisell, Lady Murray, died in 1759. He had changed his name from Hamilton to Baillie as a mark of respect.

The mansion house is possibly the only remaining complete building designed by Robert Adam, as most of his other works were additions to existing buildings.  The Adelphi, London, in London, was a speculative neoclassical terraced housing development by the Adam brothers but is now largely demolished, leaving Mellerstain House as an important record of Robert Adam's work.

The interior is a masterpiece of delicate and colourful plasterwork, comprising a small sitting room (originally a breakfast room), a beautiful library (a double cube design), a music room (originally the dining room), the main drawing room, with original silk brocade wall coverings, a small drawing room (originally a bed chamber) and a small library (originally two dressing rooms). The main entrance hall leads to a long corridor with a staircase to the bedroom floor, from which there is a small back staircase leading to a large gallery room running north to south.

Original wallpapers, hand printed in the 18th and 19th centuries, can be seen in the bedrooms. The Great Gallery displays costumes, fans, embroideries and documents.

The house stands in 80 hectares of parkland, with an Italianate formal terraced garden at the rear, with a sweeping stretch of lawn descending to a lake.  These gardens were designed around 1910 by Sir Reginald Blomfield.

References

External links
 

Country houses in the Scottish Borders
Inventory of Gardens and Designed Landscapes
Gardens in the Scottish Borders
Historic house museums in the Scottish Borders
Category A listed houses in Scotland
Category A listed buildings in the Scottish Borders